Yimnashaniana jianfenglingensis is a species of beetle in the family Cerambycidae, and the only species in the genus Yimnashaniana. It was described by Hua in 1986.

References

Gyaritini
Beetles described in 1986